Brusque is a city in Santa Catarina, Brazil. It was founded in 1860, by 55 German immigrants.

The city was originally called Colônia Itajahy, but on 17 January 1890 it was renamed Brusque after former Santa Catarina province president Francisco Carlos de Araújo Brusque.

Sports 

The official football team is Brusque Futebol Clube, founded on October 12, 1987.

Brusque has a strong women's volleyball team in the Brazilian Super League.

Curiosities 

- The city is a pioneer in the invention of the voting machine, and the first polling station to use it was also in Brusque (1988).

- First Latin American city to have public computers (1995).

- Headquarters of the first spinning industry of Santa Catarina (1892 - Textile Factory Renaux).

- Headquarters of the only English colony of Santa Catarina (1867).

- The only city in Brazil to use chlorine dioxide to treat water consumed by the population.

Current ethnic composition:
90% Whites; 5% Pardos; 4% Blacks; 0.5% Native American; 0.5% Asian. 
Original Population: 50% German; 30% Italian; 10% Portuguese; 9% African; 1% Asian.

Religions 
80% Catholics; 15% Lutherans; 4% Evangelicals;
1% Jehovah's Witness.

Notable people 
Júlia Bergmann, volleyball player for the Brazilian national team
Murilo Fischer - Professional road bicycle racer
Ederson Tormena - Footballer
Bruno Moritz - Musician
Brandão - Footballer 
Luciano Hang - Businessman

References

External links 
 Brusque page

Municipalities in Santa Catarina (state)
Populated places established in 1860
German-Brazilian culture